Valerie Gaydos (born July 3, 1967) is an American businesswoman and politician serving as a member of the Pennsylvania House of Representatives from the 44th district. Elected in November 2018, she assumed office on December 1, 2018.

Early life and education 
Gaydos was born in Pittsburgh in 1967. After graduating from Sewickley Academy in 1986, she earned a Bachelor of Arts degree in Russian language and economics from Dickinson College in 1989.

Career 
Gaydos began her career as a legislative assistant for the Pennsylvania State Senate Republican Caucus. Later, she was the director of the Greater Baltimore Technology Council and founded Capitol Growth, Inc. in 1994. She is the president of 51st Associates, LLC and the Angel Venture Forum. Gaydos was elected to the Pennsylvania House of Representatives in November 2018 and assumed office on December 1, 2018. During the 2019–2020 legislative session, Gaydos served as chair of the House Commerce Committee's Subcommittee on Economic Development. In the 2021–2022 session, she is chair of the Commerce Committee's Subcommittee on Small Business and secretary of the House Liquor Control Committee.

References 

1967 births
Living people
Politicians from Pittsburgh
Sewickley Academy alumni
Dickinson College alumni
Republican Party members of the Pennsylvania House of Representatives
Women state legislators in Pennsylvania
21st-century American women